Tris(dibenzylideneacetone)dipalladium(0) or [Pd2(dba)3] is an organopalladium compound. The compound is a complex of palladium(0) with dibenzylideneacetone (dba).  It is a dark-purple/brown solid, which is modestly soluble in organic solvents.  Because the dba ligands are easily displaced, the complex is used as a homogeneous catalyst in organic synthesis.

Preparation and structure

First reported in 1970, it is prepared from dibenzylideneacetone and sodium tetrachloropalladate. Because it is commonly recrystallized from chloroform, the complex is often supplied as the adduct [Pd2(dba)3·CHCl3].  The purity of samples can be variable.

In [Pd2(dba)3], the pair of Pd atoms are separated by 320 pm but are tied together by dba units. The Pd(0) centres are bound to the alkene parts of the dba ligands.

Applications
[Pd2(dba)3] is used as a source of soluble Pd(0), in particular as a catalyst for various coupling reactions. Examples of reactions using this reagent are the Negishi coupling, Suzuki coupling, Carroll rearrangement, and Trost asymmetric allylic alkylation, as well as Buchwald–Hartwig amination. 

Related Pd(0) complexes are [Pd(dba)2] and tetrakis(triphenylphosphine)palladium(0).

References

Catalysts
Organopalladium compounds